Progress M-04M, identified by NASA as Progress 36P, was a Russian Progress spacecraft launched in February 2010 to resupply the International Space Station. It was docked with the aft port of the Zvezda module of the station.

Launch
Progress M-04M was launched by a Soyuz-U carrier rocket, flying from Site 1/5 at the Baikonur Cosmodrome. The launch occurred at 03:45 UTC on 3 February 2010.

Docking
After just over three days of free flight, Progress M-04M docked with the Zvezda module of the International Space Station at 04:26 UTC on 5 February 2010. Its docking marked the first time four Russian spacecraft had been docked to the station at the same time, joining the Soyuz TMA-16, Soyuz TMA-17 and Progress M-03M spacecraft already docked. It remained docked until 10 May 2010, when it departed, allowing Soyuz TMA-17 to be moved to the Zvezda aft port to clear the way for the arrival of the Rassvet module, to be delivered by Space Shuttle Atlantis on STS-132 later that month.

Cargo
The Progress M-04M spacecraft delivered  of cargo to the ISS. This included water to be used by systems in the Russian segment of the station, propellant to refuel the station and to perform orbital manoeuvres, food and medical supplies.

Undocking

Progress M-04M undocked from the ISS on 10 May 2010. On 7 May 2010, Russian Space Agency's Mission Control announced that the ISS crew had loaded Progress M-04M with garbage and readied the spacecraft for undocking. The command for undocking was issued at 11:13 UTC, and three minutes later Progress M-04M separated from the Zvezda module. Cosmonauts Aleksandr Skvortsov and Mikhail Kornienko monitored the undocking with photo and video cameras focusing on the Progress docking mechanism to confirm that there were no missing or damaged O-ring seals on the docking interface.

Deorbited
The spacecraft stayed in an autonomous flight for 60 days after undocking and take part in the Reflection geophysical experiment to study reflective characteristics of the freighter's hull and the transparency of the Earth's atmosphere. Progress M-04M was deorbited on 1 July 2010 over the Pacific Ocean. The deorbit burn began at 13:54 UTC. At about 14:40, remaining parts of the spacecraft which had not burnt during the reentry, fell down in the south area of the Pacific Ocean, 37°47′ South, and 235°09′ West.

References 

Progress (spacecraft) missions
Spacecraft launched in 2010
Spacecraft which reentered in 2010
Supply vehicles for the International Space Station
Spacecraft launched by Soyuz-U rockets